Superior Civilian Service Award or Superior Civilian Service Medal may refer to the following U.S. awards: 
Department of the Army Superior Civilian Service Award
Navy Superior Civilian Service Award
NIMA Superior Civilian Service Award issued by the National Imagery and Mapping Agency
DeCA Superior Civilian Service Award issued by the Defense Commissary Agency
DOD Inspector General Superior Civilian Service Award  issued by the US Department of Defense Inspector General

See also
Civilian Service Medal